Courts Service may refer to any of the following:

 Her Majesty's Courts Service, an agency formerly responsible for Courts administration in England and Wales
 Her Majesty's Courts and Tribunals Service
 Northern Ireland Courts and Tribunals Service
 Scottish Courts and Tribunals Service
 Courts Service, an agency responsible for administration of the Courts of the Republic of Ireland